Zubek is a Polish surname. Notable people with the surname include:

John Zubek (1925-1974), Canadian psychologist
Józef Zubek (1914-1988), Polish soldier
Marek Zúbek (born 1975), Czech footballer
Mark Zubek (born 1974), Canadian record producer

Polish-language surnames